Am Timan Airport  is an airport serving Am Timan in Chad.

History 
Am Timan Airport is an airport located in the Salamat region of Chad. It provides domestic flights to the country's capital N'Djamena. In March 2019, Tarco Airlines from Sudan started a weekly flight from the airport to Khartoum.

Airlines and destinations

See also
List of airports in Chad

References

External links 
 Airport record for Am Timan Airport at Landings.com

Airports in Chad
Salamat Region